The 1976 NCAA Division III Soccer Championship was the third annual tournament held by the NCAA to determine the best men's Division III college soccer program in the United States.

The finals were played at Elizabethtown College in Elizabethtown, Pennsylvania.

Brandeis defeated Brockport State in the final, 2–1 after two overtime periods, claiming the Judges' first NCAA Division III national title.

Bracket

Final

See also
 1976 NCAA Division I Soccer Tournament
 1976 NCAA Division II Soccer Championship
 1976 NAIA Soccer Championship

References 

NCAA Division III Men's Soccer Championship
NCAA
1976 in sports in Pennsylvania